Huron is a city in Atchison County, Kansas, United States.  As of the 2020 census, the population of the city was 74.

History
Huron was platted in 1882 when the railroad was extended to that point. The city was named for Col. Anthony Huron, an original owner of the town site.

Geography
Huron is located at  (39.638807, -95.351981).

Demographics

2010 census
As of the census of 2010, there were 54 people, 20 households, and 13 families residing in the city. The racial makeup of the city was 98.1% White and 1.9% from two or more races. Hispanic or Latino of any race were 1.9% of the population.

There were 20 households, of which 40.0% had children under the age of 18 living with them, 50.0% were married couples living together, 10.0% had a female householder with no husband present, 5.0% had a male householder with no wife present, and 35.0% were non-families. 30.0% of all households were made up of individuals, and 10% had someone living alone who was 65 years of age or older. The average household size was 2.70 and the average family size was 3.23.

The median age in the city was 41 years. 31.5% of residents were under the age of 18; 5.6% were between the ages of 18 and 24; 27.9% were from 25 to 44; 27.8% were from 45 to 64; and 7.4% were 65 years of age or older. The gender makeup of the city was 51.9% male and 48.1% female.

2000 census
As of the census of 2000, there were 87 people, 27 households, and 24 families residing in the city. The racial makeup of the city was 96.55% White, 1.15% African American, 1.15% Native American and 1.15% Asian. Hispanic or Latino of any race were 1.15% of the population.

There were 27 households, out of which 37.0% had children under the age of 18 living with them, 59.3% were married couples living together, 11.1% had a female householder with no husband present, and 11.1% were non-families. 11.1% of all households were made up of individuals, and 3.7% had someone living alone who was 65 years of age or older. The average household size was 3.22 and the average family size was 3.38.

In the city, the population was spread out, with 39.1% under the age of 18, 9.2% from 18 to 24, 28.7% from 25 to 44, 16.1% from 45 to 64, and 6.9% who were 65 years of age or older. The median age was 29 years. For every 100 females, there were 112.2 males. For every 100 females age 18 and over, there were 120.8 males.

The median income for a household in the city was $30,625, and the median income for a family was $43,750. Males had a median income of $21,750 versus $26,250 for females. The per capita income for the city was $10,776. There were 20.0% of families and 34.8% of the population living below the poverty line, including 68.4% of under eighteens and 42.9% of those over 64.

References

Further reading

External links
 Huron - Directory of Public Officials
 USD 377, local school district
 Huron city map, KDOT

Cities in Kansas
Cities in Atchison County, Kansas
1882 establishments in Kansas
Populated places established in 1882